Juan Pablo Grass Galvez (born 6 June 1980) is a Bolivian football manager and former player who played as a forward.

Playing career
Born in Bermejo, Grass made his senior debut with The Strongest on 16 March 1997, in a 2–0 win over Independiente Petrolero. He moved to the latter club in the following year, scoring 23 league goals within three seasons.

Grass spent the 2001 season with Real Potosí, before returning to Independiente in the following year. He then represented Stormers San Lorenzo in the 2003 campaign, before rejoining Potosí in 2004.

Grass played for Fancesa in 2006, before rejoining Independiente for a third spell in 2007. He also played for Fancesa in 2016, before appearing with Alcalá in the following year.

At international level, Grass represented the Bolivia national under-20 team in the 1999 South American U-20 Championship.

Managerial career
After retiring, Grass worked as manager of the youth teams of his main club Independiente. On 9 September 2022, he was named interim manager of the first team, after Marcelo Robledo resigned. In November, he was named manager for the upcoming season, after Rodrigo Venegas left.

On 16 February 2023, with just three matches into the new campaign, Grass was sacked.

References

External links

1980 births
Living people
Bolivian footballers
Association football forwards
Bolivian Primera División players
The Strongest players
Club Independiente Petrolero players
Club Real Potosí players
Bolivian football managers
Bolivian Primera División managers
Independiente Petrolero managers